Stuart Anthony Douglas (born 9 April 1978 in Enfield) is an English retired footballer. In October 2020, he was appointed as physiotherapist at Championship club AFC Bournemouth.

Career

Douglas began his career with Luton Town as a youth player, going on to make 146 football league appearances for the club. Having fallen out of favour at the club, Douglas spent time on loan at Oxford United and Rushden & Diamonds before being released at the end of the 2001–02 season, moving to Boston United in August 2002. Douglas left Boston in 2004, spending time in Finland playing for RoPS before returning to England with Dagenham & Redbridge.

Prior to the 2009–10 season, Douglas was forced to undergo surgery to insert titanium plates into his neck to fix prolapsed discs in his spine. Following the operation, he was unable to regain his place in the Bath City side and instead joined Conference South leaders Newport County in February 2010 in a loan exchange deal with Dave Gilroy. He made his debut for the club on 20 February as a substitute in place of Craig Reid during a 4–0 win over Hampton & Richmond Borough. He made a total of six appearances during his loan spell, scoring his only goal during a 5–1 win over Basingstoke Town, before returning to Bath in March 2010. At the end of the season, with Bath winning promotion to the Conference Premier, Douglas was released, and in August 2010, following a successful pre-season spell, he signed for Dorchester Town. He was released by The Magpies in October 2010. He joined Poole Town on 4 November 2010.

Personal life

Douglas has three sons named Marley, Tee-jay and Ocean. He also has a daughter called Ava-Rae. He is a qualified physiotherapist.

He runs a design company with his sister Scarlette Douglas. The pair also present property show Worst House on the Street.

References

External links

1978 births
Living people
Footballers from Enfield, London
English footballers
Expatriate footballers in Finland
Luton Town F.C. players
Oxford United F.C. players
Rushden & Diamonds F.C. players
Boston United F.C. players
Rovaniemen Palloseura players
Dagenham & Redbridge F.C. players
Crawley Town F.C. players
Weymouth F.C. players
Bath City F.C. players
Newport County A.F.C. players
Dorchester Town F.C. players
National League (English football) players
English Football League players
Veikkausliiga players
AFC Wimbledon non-playing staff
Association football physiotherapists
Poole Town F.C. players
Association football forwards
AFC Bournemouth non-playing staff